Alfred Stevens Gage (February 6, 1860 – June 23, 1928) was an American rancher and businessman who founded the A. S. Gage Ranch in the Trans-Pecos region of West Texas. At its greatest extent his ranch extended over 500,000 acres.

Gage was a native of Vermont who moved to San Antonio, Texas, where he became a successful businessman and banker. He then moved to Marathon, Texas seeking opportunity in ranching. In 1926-1927, he had the Gage Hotel constructed by the firm of Trost & Trost to offer visitors to Marathon better lodging. The building also served as his residence and headquarters for his local cattle and banking interests.

References

External links
Gage Biography at Handbook of Texas

1860 births
1928 deaths
Ranchers from Texas